First Dude may refer to:
 First Dude (horse), an American Thoroughbred racehorse
 First Gentleman, the unofficial title used in some countries for the spouse of an elected head of state
 Todd Palin (born 1964), the husband of former Alaska Governor Sarah Palin